Vayeshev, Vayeishev, or Vayesheb (—Hebrew for "and he lived," the first word of the parashah) is the ninth weekly Torah portion (parashah) in the annual Jewish cycle of Torah reading. The parashah constitutes . The parashah tells the stories of how Jacob's other sons sold Joseph into captivity in Egypt, how Judah wronged his daughter-in-law Tamar who then tricked him into fulfilling his oath, and how Joseph served Potiphar and was imprisoned when falsely accused of assaulting Potiphar's wife.

The parashah is made up of 5,972 Hebrew letters, 1,558 Hebrew words, 112 verses, and 190 lines in a Torah Scroll (Sefer Torah). Jews read it the ninth Sabbath after Simchat Torah, in late November or December.

Readings
In the Masoretic Text of the Tanakh (Hebrew Bible), Parashat Vayeshev has three "open portion" (petuchah) divisions (roughly equivalent to paragraphs, often abbreviated with the Hebrew letter  (peh)). Parashat Vayeshev has one further subdivision, called a "closed portion" (setumah) division (abbreviated with the Hebrew letter  (samekh)) within the second open portion . The first open portion spans the first three readings. The second open portion spans the fourth through sixth readings. And the third open portion coincides with the seventh reading. The single closed portion division sets off the fourth reading from the fifth reading.

First reading—Genesis 37:1–11
In the first reading, Jacob lived in the land of Canaan, and this is his family's story. When Joseph was 17, he fed the flock with his brothers, and he brought Jacob an evil report about his brothers. Because Joseph was the son of Jacob's old age, Jacob loved him more than his other children, and Jacob made him a coat of many colors, which caused Joseph's brothers to hate him. And Joseph made his brothers hate him more when he told them that he dreamed that they were binding sheaves in the field, and their sheaves bowed down to his sheaf. He told his brothers another dream, in which the sun, the moon, and eleven stars bowed down to him, and when he told his father, Jacob rebuked him, asking whether he, Joseph's mother, and his brothers would bow down to Joseph. Joseph's brothers envied him, but Jacob kept what he said in mind. The first reading ends here.

Second reading—Genesis 37:12–22
In the second reading, when the brothers went to feed the flock in Shechem, Jacob sent Joseph to see whether all was well with them. A man found Joseph and asked him what he sought, and when he told the man that he sought his brothers, the man told him that they had departed for Dothan. When Joseph's brothers saw him coming, they conspired to kill him, cast him into a pit, say that a beast had devoured him, and see what would become of his dreams then. But Reuben persuaded them not to kill him but to cast him into a pit, hoping to restore him to Jacob later. The second reading ends here.

Third reading—Genesis 37:23–36
In the third reading, Joseph's brothers stripped him of his coat of many colors and cast him into an empty pit. They sat down to eat, and when they saw a caravan of Ishmaelites from Gilead bringing spices and balm to Egypt, Judah persuaded the brothers to sell Joseph to the Ishmaelites. Passing Midianite merchants drew Joseph out of the pit, and sold Joseph to the Ishmaelites for 20 shekels of silver, and they brought him to Egypt. When Reuben returned to the pit and Joseph was gone, he rent his clothes and asked his brothers where he could go now. They took Joseph's coat of many colors, dipped it in goat's blood, and sent it to Jacob to identify. Jacob concluded that a beast had devoured Joseph, and rent his garments, put on sackcloth, and mourned for his son. All his sons and daughters tried in vain to comfort him. And the Midianites sold Joseph in Egypt to Potiphar, Pharaoh's captain of the guard. The third reading and the first open portion end here with the end of chapter .

Fourth reading—Genesis chapter 38
In the fourth reading, chapter , Judah left his brothers to live near an Adullamite named Hirah. Judah married the daughter of a Canaanite named Shua and had three sons named Er, Onan, and Shelah, the last of whom was born in Chezib. Judah arranged for Er to marry a woman named Tamar, but Er was wicked and God killed him. Judah directed Onan to perform a brother's duty and have children with Tamar in Er's name. But Onan knew that the children would not be counted as his, so he spilled his seed, and God killed him as well. Then Judah told Tamar to remain a widow in his house until Shelah could grown up, thinking that if Tamar wed Shelah, he might also die. Later, when Judah's wife died, he went with his friend Hirah to his sheep-shearers at Timnah. When Tamar learned that Judah had gone to Timnah, she took off her widow's garments and put on a veil and sat on the road to Timnah, for she saw that Shelah had grown up and Judah had not given her to be his wife. Judah took her for a harlot, offered her a young goat for her services, and gave her his signet and staff as a pledge for payment, and they cohabited and she conceived. Judah sent Hirah to deliver the young goat and collect his pledge, but he asked about and did not find her. When Hirah reported to Judah that the men of the place said that there had been no harlot there, Judah put the matter to rest so as not to be put to shame. About three months later, Judah heard that Tamar had played the harlot and become pregnant, and he ordered her to be brought forth and burned. When they seized her, she sent Judah the pledge to identify, saying that she was pregnant by the man whose things they were. Judah acknowledged them and said that she was more righteous than he, inasmuch as he had failed to give her to Shelah. When Tamar delivered, one twin—whom she would name Zerah—put out a hand and the midwife bound it with a scarlet thread, but then he drew it back and his brother—whom she would name Perez—came out. The fourth reading and a closed portion end here with the end of chapter .

Fifth reading—Genesis 39:1–6
In the fifth reading, in chapter , Pharaoh's captain of the guard Potiphar bought Joseph from the Ishmaelites. When Potiphar saw that God was with Joseph and prospered all that he did, Potiphar appointed him overseer over his house and gave him charge of all that he had, and God blessed Pharaoh's house for Joseph's sake. Now Joseph was handsome. The fifth reading ends here.

Sixth reading—Genesis 39:7–23
In the sixth reading, Potiphar's wife repeatedly asked Joseph to lie with her, but he declined, asking how he could sin so against Potiphar and God. One day, when the men of the house were away, she caught him by his garment and asked him to lie with her, but he fled, leaving his garment behind. When Potiphar came home, she accused Joseph of trying to force himself on her, and Potiphar put Joseph in the prison where the king's prisoners were held. But God was with Joseph, and gave him favor in the sight of the warden, who committed all the prisoners to Joseph's charge. The sixth reading and the second open portion (petuchah) end here with the end of chapter .

Seventh reading—Genesis chapter 40
In the seventh reading, chapter , when the Pharaoh's butler and baker offended him, the Pharaoh put them into the prison as well. One night, the butler and the baker each dreamed a dream. Finding them sad, Joseph asked the cause, and they told him that it was because no one could interpret their dreams. Acknowledging that interpretations belong to God, Joseph asked them to tell him their dreams. The butler told Joseph that he dreamt that he saw a vine with three branches blossom and bring forth grapes, which he took and pressed into Pharaoh's cup, which he gave to Pharaoh. Joseph interpreted that within three days, Pharaoh would lift up the butler's head and restore him to his office, where he would give Pharaoh his cup just as he used to do. And Joseph asked the butler to remember him and mention him to Pharaoh, so that he might be brought out of the prison, for he had been stolen away from his land and had done nothing to warrant his imprisonment. When the baker saw that the interpretation of the butler's dream was good, he told Joseph his dream: He saw three baskets of white bread on his head, and the birds ate them out of the basket. Joseph interpreted that within three days Pharaoh would lift up the baker's head and hang him on a tree, and the birds would eat his flesh. In the maftir reading that concludes the parashah, on the third day, which was Pharaoh's birthday, Pharaoh made a feast, restored the chief butler to his butlership, and hanged the baker, just as Joseph had predicted. But the butler forgot about Joseph. The seventh reading, the third open portion, chapter , and the parashah end here.

Readings according to the triennial cycle
Jews who read the Torah according to the triennial cycle of Torah reading read the parashah according to the following schedule:

In inner-biblical interpretation
The parashah has parallels or is discussed in these Biblical sources:

Genesis chapter 37
 reports that Jacob made Joseph "a coat of many colors" (ketonet pasim). Similarly, 2 Samuel  reports that David's daughter Tamar had "a garment of many colors" (ketonet pasim).  explains that "with such robes were the king's daughters that were virgins appareled." As  reports Joseph's half-brothers assaulted him,  recounts that Tamar's half-brother Amnon assaulted her. And as  reports that Joseph's coat was marred to make it appear that Joseph was torn in pieces,  reports that Tamar's coat was torn.

Genesis chapter 38

In classical rabbinic interpretation
The parashah is discussed in these rabbinic sources from the era of the Mishnah and the Talmud:

Genesis chapter 37

Because of Rachel's modesty, however, God restored the rights of the firstborn to Rachel's son Joseph from Leah's son Reuben. To teach what caused Leah to anticipate Rachel with her prayer for mercy, Rav taught that Leah's eyes were sore (as  reports) from her crying about what she heard at the crossroads. There she heard people saying: "Rebecca has two sons, and Laban has two daughters; the elder daughter should marry the elder son, and the younger daughter should marry the younger son." Leah inquired about the elder son, and the people said that he was a wicked man, a highway robber. And Leah asked about the younger son, and the people said that he was "a quiet man dwelling in tents." (.) So she cried about her fate until her eyelashes fell out.

After introducing "the line of Jacob,"  cites only Joseph. The Gemara explained that the verse indicates that Joseph was worthy of having 12 tribes descend from him, as they did from his father Jacob. Nevertheless, ten sons (who, added to Joseph's two, made the total of 12) issued from Joseph's brother Benjamin and were given names on Joseph's account (as  reports). A son was called Bela, because Joseph was swallowed up (nivla) among the peoples. A son was called Becher, because Joseph was the firstborn (bechor) of his mother. A son was called Ashbel, because God sent Joseph into captivity (shevao el). A son was called Gera, because Joseph dwelt (gar) in a strange land. A son was called Naaman, because Joseph was especially beloved (na'im). Sons were called Ehi and Rosh, because Joseph was to Benjamin "my brother" (achi) and chief (rosh). Sons were called Muppim and Huppim, because Benjamin said that Joseph did not see Benjamin's marriage-canopy (chuppah). A son was called Ard, because Joseph descended (yarad) among the peoples. Others explain that he was called Ard, because Joseph's face was like a rose (vered).

Rava bar Mehasia said in the name of Rav Hama bar Goria in Rav's name that a man should never single out one son among his other sons, for on account of the small weight of silk that Jacob gave Joseph more than he gave his other sons (as reported in ), his brothers became jealous of Joseph and the matter resulted in the Israelites' descent into Egypt.

 recounts Joseph's dreams. When he had a bad dream, he used to quote , "The dreams speak falsely." The Gemara resolved the contradiction, teaching that , "I speak with him in a dream?" refers to dreams that come through an angel, whereas , "The dreams speak falsely," refers to dreams that come through a demon. The Gemara taught that a dream is a sixtieth part of prophecy. Rabbi Hanan taught that even if the Master of Dreams (an angel, in a dream that truly foretells the future) tells a person that on the next day the person will die, the person should not desist from prayer, for as  says, "For in the multitude of dreams are vanities and also many words, but fear God." (Although a dream may seem reliably to predict the future, it will not necessarily come true; one must place one's trust in God.) Rabbi Samuel bar Nahmani said in the name of Rabbi Jonathan that a person is shown in a dream only what is suggested by the person's own thoughts (while awake), as  says, "As for you, Oh King, your thoughts came into your mind upon your bed," and  says, "That you may know the thoughts of the heart."

But Rabbi Levi taught that Jacob did not know that Joseph's dream in fact applied to Bilhah, Rachel's handmaid, who had brought Joseph up like a mother.

The Pirke De-Rabbi Eliezer taught that Joseph saw the sons of Jacob's concubines eating the flesh of roes and sheep while they were still alive and reported on them to Jacob. And so they could not stand to see Joseph's face anymore in peace, as  reports.

Reading , "And he said to him: ‘Here am I,'" Rabbi Hama bar Rabbi Hanina said that after Joseph went missing, Jacob was ever mindful of Joseph words and Jacob's insides were torn up about them. For Jacob realized that Joseph had known that his brothers hated him, and yet he answered Jacob: ‘Here am I.'"

Reading in  the three parallel clauses, "And a certain man found him," "And the man asked him," "And the man said," Rabbi Yannai deduced that three angels met Joseph.

The Pirke De-Rabbi Eliezer taught that Gabriel asked Joseph what he sought. Joseph told Gabriel that he sought his brethren, as  reports. And Gabriel led Joseph to his brethren.

Noting that  reports, "And Reuben heard it," a Midrash asked where Reuben had been. Rabbi Judah taught that each one of the brothers attended to Jacob one day, and that day it was Reuben's turn. Rabbi Nehemiah taught that Reuben reasoned that he was the firstborn and he alone would be held responsible for the crime. Because Joseph counted Reuben as a brother, Reuben felt motivated to rescue Joseph.

Reading , Rabbi Eleazar contrasted Reuben's magnanimity with Esau's jealousy. As  reports, Esau voluntarily sold his birthright, but as  says, "Esau hated Jacob," and as  says, "And he said, 'Is not he rightly named Jacob? for he has supplanted me these two times.'" In Reuben's case, Joseph took Reuben's birthright from him against his will, as 1 Chronicles  reports, "for as much as he defiled his father's couch, his birthright was given to the sons of Joseph." Nonetheless, Reuben was not jealous of Joseph, as  reports, "And Reuben heard it, and delivered him out of their hand."

Rabbi Aha interpreted the words "the pit was empty" to teach that Jacob's pit was emptied—Jacob's children were emptied of their compassion. The Midrash interpreted the words "there was no water in it" to teach that there was no recognition of Torah in it, as Torah is likened to water, as  says, "everyone that thirsts, come for water." For the Torah (in ) says, "If a man be found stealing any of his brethren of the children of Israel . . . and sell him, then that thief shall die," and yet Joseph's brothers sold their brother.

Rabbi Judah ben Ilai taught that Scripture speaks in praise of Judah.

In contrast, another Midrash faulted Judah for not calling on the brothers to return Joseph to Jacob. Reading , "For this commandment that I command you this day . . . is very near to you, in your mouth, and in your heart," a Midrash interpreted "heart" and "mouth" to symbolize the beginning and end of fulfilling a precept and thus read  as an exhortation to complete a good deed once started. Thus Rabbi Hiyya bar Abba taught that if one begins a precept and does not complete it, the result will be that he will bury his wife and children. The Midrash cited as support for this proposition the experience of Judah, who began a precept and did not complete it. And had Judah called for Joseph's brothers to restore Joseph to their father, they would have listened to him then, as well. Thus, because Judah began a precept (the good deed toward Joseph) and did not complete it, he buried his wife and two sons, as  reports, "Shua's daughter, the wife of Judah, died," and  further reports, "Er and Onan died in the land of Canaan." The Midrash illustrated this by citing how Moses began a precept by taking the bones of Joseph with him, as  reports, "And Moses took the bones of Joseph with him." But because Moses never brought Joseph's bones into the Land of Israel, the precept is attributed to the Israelites, who buried them, as  reports, "And the bones of Joseph, which the children of Israel brought up out of Egypt, they buried in Shechem."  does not say, "Which Moses brought up out of Egypt," but "Which the children of Israel brought up out of Egypt." And the Midrash explained that the reason that they buried Joseph's bones in Shechem could be compared to a case in which some thieves stole a cask of wine, and when the owner discovered them, the owner told them that after they had consumed the wine, they needed to return the cask to its proper place. So when the brothers sold Joseph, it was from Shechem that they sold him, as  reports, "And Israel said to Joseph: 'Do not your brothers feed the flock in Shechem?'" God told the brothers that since they had sold Joseph from Shechem, they needed to return Joseph's bones to Shechem.

Rabbi Judah ben Simon taught that God required each of the Israelites to give a half-shekel (as reported in ) because (as reported in ) their ancestors had sold Joseph to the Ishmaelites for 20 shekels.

Rabbi Tarfon taught that God came from Mount Sinai (or others say Mount Seir) and was revealed to the children of Esau, as  says, “The Lord came from Sinai, and rose from Seir to them,” and “Seir” means the children of Esau, as  says, “And Esau dwelt in Mount Seir.” God asked them whether they would accept the Torah, and they asked what was written in it.

Reading , "and they sent the coat of many colors, and they brought it to their father; and said: ‘This have we found. Know now whether it is your son's coat or not,'" Rabbi Johanan taught that God ordained that since Judah said this to his father, he too would hear (from Tamar in ) the challenge: Know now, whose are these?

Reading , a Midrash asked how many times Joseph was sold. Rabbi Judan and Rav Huna disagreed. Rabbi Judan maintained that Joseph was sold four times: His brothers sold him to the Ishmaelites, the Ishmaelites to the merchants, the merchants to the Midianites, and the Midianites into Egypt. Rav Huna said Joseph was sold five times, concluding with the Midianites selling him to the Egyptians, and the Egyptians to Potiphar.

Genesis chapter 38
The Gemara questioned why the Mishnah bothered to say so and proposed that one might think that Jews should forbear out of respect for Judah. But the Gemara deduced that the Mishnah instructed that Jews read and translate the chapter to show that the chapter actually redounds to Judah's credit, as it records in  that he confessed his wrongdoing.

The Midrash told that when Joseph's brothers tried to comfort Jacob and he refused to be comforted, they told Jacob that Judah was responsible. They said that had Judah only told them not to sell Joseph, they would have obeyed. But Judah told them that they should sell Joseph to the Ishmaelites (as reported in ). As a result, the brothers excommunicated Judah (when they saw the grief that they had caused Jacob), for  says, "And it came to pass at that time, that Judah went down (vayered) from his brethren." The Midrash argued that  could have said "and he went" (vayelekh) instead of "and he went down" (vayered). Thus the Midrash deduced that Judah suffered a descent and was excommunicated by his brothers.

Noting that  reports that "Samson went down to Timnah," the Gemara asked why  says, "Behold, your father-in-law goes up to Timnah." Rabbi Eleazar explained that since Samson was disgraced in Timnah (in that he married a Philistine woman from there),  reports that he "went down." But since Judah was exalted by virtue of having gone to Timnah (in that, as  reports, from Judah's encounter there, Tamar bore Perez, a progenitor of King David),  reports that he went "up." Rabbi Samuel bar Nahmani, however, taught that there were two places named Timnah, one that people reached by going down and the other that people reached by going up. And Rav Papa taught that there was only one place named Timnah, and those who came to it from one direction had to descend, while those who came from another direction had to ascend.

Alternatively, Rav Hanin said in the name of Rav that there is a place called Enaim, and it is the same place mentioned in  when it speaks of "Tappuah and Enam." Alternatively, Rabbi Samuel bar Nahmani taught that the place is called Enaim because Tamar gave eyes (einaim) to her words; that is, Tamar gave convincing replies to Judah's questions. When Judah solicited her, he asked her if she was a Gentile, and she replied that she was a convert. When Judah asked her if she was a married woman, she replied that she was unmarried. When Judah asked her if perhaps her father had accepted marriage proposals on her behalf betrothals (making her forbidden to Judah), she replied that she was an orphan. When Judah asked her if perhaps she was ritually unclean (because she was a menstruant, or niddah, and thus forbidden to Judah), she replied that she was clean.

Rabbi Eleazar explained that Tamar had covered her face in her father-in-law's house (and thus Judah had never seen her face and did not recognize her), for Rabbi Samuel bar Nahmani said in the name of Rabbi Jonathan that every daughter-in-law who is modest in her father-in-law's house merits that kings and prophets should issue from her. In support of that proposition, the Gemara noted that kings descended from Tamar through David. And prophets descended from Tamar, as  says, "The vision of Isaiah the son of Amoz," and Rabbi Levi taught that there is a tradition that Amoz was the brother of Amaziah the King of Judah, and thus a descendant of David and thus of Tamar.

Rabbi Eleazar explained that the verb thus implies that after Tamar's proofs—Judah's signet, cord, and staff—were found, Samael (the angel of evil) removed them and the archangel Gabriel restored them. Of David, Michtam," Rabbi Johanan taught that when Samael removed Tamar's proofs, she became like a silent dove.

Rav Zutra bar Tobiah said in the name of Rav (or according to others, Rav Hanah bar Bizna said it in the name of Rabbi Simeon the Pious, or according to others, Rabbi Johanan said in the name of Rabbi Simeon ben Yohai) that it is better for a person to choose to be executed in a fiery furnace than to shame another in public. For even to save herself from being burned, Tamar in  did not implicate Judah publicly by name.

Similarly, the Gemara derived from  a lesson about how to give to the poor. The Gemara told a story. A poor man lived in Mar Ukba's neighborhood, and every day Mar Ukba would put four zuz into the poor man's door socket. One day, the poor man thought that he would try to find out who did him this kindness. That day Mar Ukba came home from the house of study with his wife. When the poor man saw them moving the door to make their donation, the poor man went to greet them, but they fled and ran into a furnace from which the fire had just been swept. They did so because, as Mar Zutra bar Tobiah said in the name of Rav (or others say Rav Huna bar Bizna said in the name of Rabbi Simeon the Pious, and still others say Rabbi Johanan said in the name of Rabbi Simeon ben Yohai), it is better for a person to go into a fiery furnace than to shame a neighbor publicly.

And in accordance with Jacob's blessing, 30 kings descended from Judah, for as  reports, David descended from Judah, and if one counts David, Solomon, Rehoboam, Abijah, Asa, Jehoshaphat and his successors until Jeconiah and Zedekiah (one finds 30 generations from Judah's son Perez to Zedekiah). And so the Midrash taught it shall be in the world to come (the Messianic era), for as  foretells, "And David My servant shall be their prince forever."

Genesis chapter 39

A Midrash taught that from the moment Joseph arrived in Potiphar's house (in the words of ), "The Lord was with Joseph, and he was successful . . . and his master saw that the Lord was with him." But the Midrash questioned whether the wicked Potiphar could see that God was with Joseph. When Joseph came to minister to Potiphar, he would whisper a prayer that God grant him favor in God's eyes and in the eyes of all who saw him. Potiphar asked Joseph what he was whispering and whether Joseph was employing sorcery against him. Joseph replied that he was praying that he should find favor with Potiphar. Thus  reports, "His master saw that the Lord was with him."

Rabbi Phinehas taught in Rabbi Simon's name that the words, "And the Lord was with Joseph," in  demonstrated that Joseph brought the Divine Presence (Shechinah) down to Egypt with him.

Rabbi Judan compared this to a drover who had twelve cows before him laden with wine. When one of the cows entered a shop belonging to a nonbeliever, the drover left the eleven and followed the one into the nonbeliever's shop. When asked why he left the eleven to follow the one, he replied that he was not concerned that wine carried by the eleven in the street would be rendered impure because it was used for idolatry, but he was concerned that the wine carried into the nonbeliever's shop might be. Similarly, Jacob's other sons were grown up and under their father's control, but Joseph was young and away from his father's supervision.

The Tosefta deduced from  that before Joseph arrived, Potiphar's house had not received a blessing, and that it was because of Joseph's arrival that Potiphar's house was blessed thereafter.

The Pesikta Rabbati taught that Joseph guarded himself against lechery and murder.

The Midrash taught that God rewarded Joseph for resisting Potiphar's wife (as reported in ) by making him ruler (hashalit) over the land of Egypt (as reported in ). The Midrash taught that Joseph received so much honor because he observed the commandments, as  teaches when it says, "Whoever keeps the commandment shall know no evil thing."

Rav Hana (or some say Hanin) bar Bizna said in the name of Rabbi Simeon the Pious that because Joseph sanctified God's Name in private when he resisted Potiphar's wife's advances, one letter from God's Name was added to Joseph's name. Rav and Samuel differed in their interpretation of the words "he went into the house to do his work." One said that it really means that Joseph went to do his household work, but the other said that Joseph went to satisfy his desires. A Baraita was taught in the School of Rabbi Ishmael that the day was Potiphar's household's feast-day, and they had all gone to their idolatrous temple, but Potiphar's wife had pretended to be ill, because she thought that she would not again have an opportunity like that day to associate with Joseph. The Gemara taught that just at the moment reported in  when "she caught him by his garment, saying: ‘Lie with me,' Jacob's image came and appeared to Joseph through the window. Jacob told Joseph that Joseph and his brothers were destined to have their names inscribed upon the stones of the ephod, and Jacob asked whether it was Joseph's wish to have his name expunged from the ephod and be called an associate of harlots, as  says, "He that keeps company with harlots wastes his substance." Rabbi Johanan said in the name of Rabbi Meir that this means that his passion subsided.

Rabbi Johanan said that he would sit at the gate of the bathhouse (mikvah), and when Jewish women came out they would look at him and have children as handsome as he was. The Rabbis asked him whether he was not afraid of the evil eye for being so boastful. Rabbi Abbahu taught that one should not read alei ayin ("by a fountain"), but olei ayin ("rising over the eye"). Rabbi Judah (or some say Jose) son of Rabbi Haninah deduced from the words "And let them [the descendants of Joseph] multiply like fishes [ve-yidgu] in the midst of the earth" in  that just as fish (dagim) in the sea are covered by water and thus the evil eye has no power over them, so the evil eye has no power over the descendants of Joseph.

The Gemara then provided an alternative explanation:  could mean that Phinehas descended from Joseph, who conquered (pitpeit) his passions (resisting Potiphar's wife, as reported in ). But the Gemara asked, did not the tribes sneer at Phinehas and (as reported in Babylonian Talmud Sanhedrin 82b and Sotah 43a) question how a youth (Phinehas) whose mother's father crammed calves for idol-worship could kill the head of a tribe in Israel (Zimri, Prince of Simeon, as reported in ). The Gemara explained that the real explanation was that Phinehas descended from both Joseph and Jethro. If Phinehas's mother's father descended from Joseph, then Phinehas's mother's mother descended from Jethro. And if Phinehas's mother's father descended from Jethro, then Phinehas's mother's mother descended from Joseph. The Gemara explained that  implies this dual explanation of "Putiel" when it says, "of the daughters of Putiel," because the plural "daughters" implies two lines of ancestry (from both Joseph and Jethro).

Rabbi Simeon ben Abba said in the name of Rabbi Johanan that wherever the word "and it came to pass" (vayehi) occurs, it signifies the occurrence of either trouble or joy—if of trouble, of unprecedented trouble; if of joy, of unprecedented joy. Rabbi Samuel bar Nahmani made a further distinction that wherever "and it came to pass" (vayehi) is found, it refers to trouble; where "and it shall be" (vehayah) is found, it refers to joyous occasions. But the Rabbis of the Midrash objected that  says, "And the Lord was (vayehi) with Joseph"—surely not an indication of trouble.

A Midrash taught that  reported the source of the kindness that Joseph showed in his life. The Midrash taught that each of the righteous practiced a particular meritorious deed: Abraham practiced circumcision, Isaac practiced prayer, and Jacob practiced truth, as  says, “You will show truth to Jacob.” The Midrash taught that Joseph stressed kindness, reading  to say, “The Lord was with Joseph, and showed kindness to him.”

Genesis chapter 40
And Joseph said to him: ‘This is the interpretation of it: . . . within yet three days shall Pharaoh lift up your head and restore you to your office; and you shall give Pharaoh's cup into his hand, after the former manner when you were his butler."

Rabbi Eleazar deduced from the report of  that "the chief baker saw that the interpretation was correct" that each of them was shown his own dream and the interpretation of the other one's dream.

In medieval Jewish interpretation
The parashah is discussed in these medieval Jewish sources:

Genesis chapter 39
The Zohar taught that Joseph walked through "the valley of the shadow of death" (in the words of ), having been brought down to Egypt, but the Shechinah was with him, as  states, "And the Lord was with Joseph." Because of the Shechinah's presence, all that Joseph did prospered in his hand. If he had something in his hand and his master wanted something else, it changed in his hand to the thing that his master wanted. Hence,  says, "made to prosper in his hand," as God was with him. Noting that  does not say, "And his master knew," but "And his master saw," the Zohar deduced that Potiphar saw every day with his eyes the miracles that God performed by the hand of Joseph.  reports, "the Lord blessed the Egyptian's house for Joseph's sake," and the Zohar taught that God guards the righteous, and for their sakes also guards the wicked with whom they are associated, so that the wicked receive blessings through the righteous. Thus the Zohar taught that God shields the righteous in this world and in the world to come.

In modern interpretation

The parashah is discussed in these modern sources:

Genesis chapters 37–50

Yehuda Radday and Haim Shore analyzed the 20,504 Hebrew words in Genesis and divided them according to whether they occur in the narrator's description, in direct human speech, or in direct Divine speech.

Donald Seybold schematized the Joseph narrative in the chart below, finding analogous relationships in each of Joseph's households.

Ephraim Speiser argued that in spite of its surface unity, the Joseph story, on closer scrutiny, yields two parallel strands similar in general outline, yet markedly different in detail. The Jahwist’s version employed the Tetragrammaton and the name “Israel.” In that version, Judah persuaded his brothers not to kill Joseph but sell him instead to Ishmaelites, who disposed of him in Egypt to an unnamed official. Joseph’s new master promoted him to the position of chief retainer. When the brothers were on their way home from their first mission to Egypt with grain, they opened their bags at a night stop and were shocked to find the payment for their purchases. Judah prevailed on his father to let Benjamin accompany them on a second journey to Egypt. Judah finally convinced Joseph that the brothers had really reformed. Joseph invited Israel to settle with his family in Goshen. The Elohist’s parallel account, in contrast, consistently used the names “Elohim” and “Jacob.” Reuben—not Judah—saved Joseph from his brothers; Joseph was left in an empty cistern, where he was picked up, unbeknown to the brothers, by Midianites; they—not the Ishmaelites—sold Joseph as a slave to an Egyptian named Potiphar. In that lowly position, Joseph served—not supervised—the other prisoners. The brothers opened their sacks—not bags—at home in Canaan—not at an encampment along the way. Reuben—not Judah—gave Jacob—not Israel—his personal guarantee of Benjamin’s safe return. Pharaoh—not Joseph—invited Jacob and his family to settle in Egypt—not just Goshen. Speiser concluded that the Joseph story can thus be traced back to two once separate, though now intertwined, accounts.

John Kselman noted that as in the Jacob cycle that precedes it, the Joseph narrative begins with the deception of a father by his offspring through an article of clothing; the deception leads to the separation of brothers for 20 years; and the climax of the story comes with the reconciliation of estranged brothers and the abatement of family strife.

Gary Rendsburg noted that Genesis often repeats the motif of the younger son. Rendsburg explained Genesis’s interest with this motif by recalling that David was the youngest of Jesse’s seven sons (see ), and Solomon was among the youngest, if not the youngest, of David’s sons (see ). The issue of who among David’s many sons would succeed him dominates the Succession Narrative in  through . The two remaining candidates were Adonijah (David’s fourth son) and Solomon, and although Adonijah was older (and once claimed the throne when David was old and feeble in ), Solomon won out. Rendsburg argued that even though firstborn royal succession was the norm in the ancient Near East, the authors of Genesis justified Solomonic rule by imbedding the notion of ultimogeniture into Genesis’s national epic. An Israelite could thus not criticize David’s selection of Solomon to succeed him as king over Israel, because Genesis reported that God had favored younger sons since Abel and blessed younger sons of Israel—Isaac, Jacob, Judah, Joseph, Perez, and Ephraim—since the inception of the covenant. More generally, Rendsburg concluded that royal scribes living in Jerusalem during the reigns of David and Solomon in the tenth century BCE were responsible for Genesis; their ultimate goal was to justify the monarchy in general, and the kingship of David and Solomon in particular; and Genesis thus appears as a piece of political propaganda.

Calling it “too good a story,” James Kugel reported that modern interpreters contrast the full-fledged tale of the Joseph story with the schematic narratives of other Genesis figures and conclude that the Joseph story reads more like a work of fiction than history. Donald Redford and other scholars following him suspected that behind the Joseph story stood an altogether invented Egyptian or Canaanite tale that was popular on its own before an editor changed the main characters to Jacob and his sons. These scholars argue that the original story told of a family of brothers in which the father spoiled the youngest, and the oldest brother, who had his own privileged status, intervened to try to save the youngest when his other brothers threatened him. Scholars theorize that when the editor first mechanically put Reuben in the role of the oldest, but as the tribe of Reuben had virtually disappeared and the audience for the story were principally descendants of Judah, Judah was given the role of spokesman and hero in the end.

Gerhard von Rad argued that the Joseph narrative is closely related to earlier Egyptian wisdom literature. Joseph is the only one of Israel's ancestors whom the Torah (in ) calls “wise” (chacham)—the same word as “sage” in Hebrew. Specialties of ancient Near Eastern sages included advising the king and interpreting dreams and other signs—just as Joseph did. Joseph displayed the cardinal sagely virtue of patience, which sages had because they believed that everything happens according to the Divine plan and would turn out for the best. Joseph thus looks like the model of an ancient Near Eastern sage, and the Joseph story looks like a didactic tale designed to teach the basic ideology of wisdom.

George Coats argued that the Joseph narrative is a literary device constructed to carry the children of Israel from Canaan to Egypt, to link preexisting stories of ancestral promises in Canaan to an Exodus narrative of oppression in and liberation from Egypt. Coats described the two principal goals of the Joseph story as (1) to describe reconciliation in a broken family despite the lack of merit of any of its members, and (2) to describe the characteristics of an ideal administrator.

Calling this either providence or predestination, Brueggemann argued that God thus worked out God's purpose through and in spite of Egypt, and through and in spite of Joseph and his brothers.

Genesis chapter 38
Hermann Gunkel argued that what he called the legend of Tamar in  depicts in part early relations in the tribe of Judah: The Tribe of Judah allied itself with Canaanites who are reflected in the legendary Hirah of Adullam and Judah's wife, Bathshua. According to Gunkel, the accounts of Er and Onan reflect that a number of Judan-Canaanitish tribes perished early. And the accounts of Perez and Zerah reflect that finally two new tribes arose.

Commandments
According to Maimonides and Sefer ha-Chinuch, there are no commandments in the parashah.

Haftarah
A haftarah is a text selected from the books of Nevi'im ("The Prophets") that is read publicly in the synagogue after the reading of the Torah on Sabbath and holiday mornings. The haftarah usually has a thematic link to the Torah reading that precedes it. 

The specific text read following Parashah Vayeshev varies according to different traditions within Judaism.

On Shabbat Hanukkah I
When Hanukkah begins on a Sabbath, two Sabbaths occur during Hanukkah.

See also
Potiphar's wife
Yusuf and Zulaikha

Notes

Further reading
The parashah is cited or discussed in these sources:

Ancient
Epic of Gilgamesh tablet 4 Mesopotamia, 14th–11th century BCE. In, e.g., Nancy K. Sandars, translator. The Epic of Gilgamesh Revised edition. Chapter 2. London: Penguin Books, 1972. (repeated dreams interpreted as omens).

"The Story of Two Brothers."  Egypt, circa 1225 BCE. In, e.g., James B. Pritchard. Ancient Near Eastern Texts Relating to the Old Testament, pages 23–25. Princeton, New Jersey: Princeton University Press, 1969.
Homer, Iliad Book 6 (Bellerophon accused of rape); Book 9 (Phoenix and father's concubine). Greece, 8th–6th century BCE.
Euripides. Hippolytus. Athens, 428 BCE. (Phaedra's false accusation of rape).

Biblical
 (levirate marriage).
 (admission of sexual sin);  (garment of many colors).

 (31:15 in NJPS) (refusal to be comforted for lost son of Rachel);  (thrown into a pit).
;  (interpreting dreams).

Early nonrabbinic
Philo. On the Unchangeableness of God 25:119. Alexandria, Egypt, early 1st century CE. In, e.g., The Works of Philo: Complete and Unabridged, New Updated Edition. Translated by Charles Duke Yonge, page 168. Peabody, Massachusetts: Hendrickson Publishers, 1993.
Josephus. Antiquities 2:2:1–2:5:3. Circa 93–94. In, e.g., The Works of Josephus: Complete and Unabridged, New Updated Edition. Translated by William Whiston, pages 52–57. Peabody, Massachusetts: Hendrickson Publishers, 1987.
Qur'an: 12:4–42. Arabia, 7th century. In, e.g., The Meaning of the Holy Qur'an. Translated by Abdullah Yusuf Ali, pages 546–60. Beltsville, Maryland: Amana Publications, 10th edition, 1997. And in The Qur'an With Annotated Interpretation in Modern English. Translated by Ali Ünal, pages 471–82. Clifton, New Jersey: Tughra Books, 2015.

Classical rabbinic
Mishnah Megillah 4:10. Land of Israel, circa 200 CE. In, e.g., The Mishnah: A New Translation. Translated by Jacob Neusner, page 323. New Haven: Yale University Press, 1988.
Tosefta: Berakhot 4:16, 18; Sanhedrin 1:3; Sotah 6:6, 9:3, 10:8; Niddah 1:7. Land of Israel, circa 300 CE. In, e.g., The Tosefta: Translated from the Hebrew, with a New Introduction. Translated by Jacob Neusner. Peabody, Massachusetts: Hendrickson Publishers, 2002.
Jerusalem Talmud: Peah 8a; Shabbat 54a, 106b; Yoma 49b; Chagigah 11a; Yevamot 25a, 43b; Ketubot 72b; Nedarim 1a; Nazir 1a; Sotah 5b, 7a, 47b; Bava Batra 8a; Sanhedrin 2a, 27b; Avodah Zarah 3a, 18b. Tiberias, Land of Israel, circa 400 CE. In, e.g., Talmud Yerushalmi. Edited by Chaim Malinowitz, Yisroel Simcha Schorr, and Mordechai Marcus, volumes 3, 14–15, 21, 27, 29–30, 32–34, 36–37, 43–44, 47–48. Brooklyn: Mesorah Publications, 2006–2020. And in, e.g., The Jerusalem Talmud: A Translation and Commentary. Edited by Jacob Neusner and translated by Jacob Neusner, Tzvee Zahavy, B. Barry Levy, and Edward Goldman. Peabody, Massachusetts: Hendrickson Publishers, 2009.
Genesis Rabbah 1:5; 6:9; 19:2; 29:4; 33:6; 41:7; 42:3; 53:11; 60:15; 61:4; 68:10; 70:4; 71:5; 73:8; 75:4; 79:1; 84:1–88:7; 89:2; 91:1; 92:9; 93:5, 7; 95:2; 97 (NV); 97:4; 99:7–8. Land of Israel, 5th century. In, e.g., Midrash Rabbah: Genesis. Translated by Harry Freedman and Maurice Simon, volume 1, pages 2, 49, 149, 231, 266, 337, 344, 470; volume 2, pages 538, 543, 622, 637, 656, 673, 691, 727, 770–820, 833, 855, 859, 863, 881, 897, 903–06, 941, 979, 982. London: Soncino Press, 1939.

Babylonian Talmud: Berakhot 7b, 20a, 34b, 43b, 55a–b; Shabbat 10b, 22a, 49b; Pesachim 50a; Yoma 35b; Megillah 10b, 22b, 25a–b; Chagigah 3a; Yevamot 34b, 59a, 76b; Ketubot 67b; Nazir 23a, 23b; Sotah 3b, 7b, 9a, 10a–11a, 13b, 36b, 43a; Baba Kama 92a; Baba Metzia 59a, 117a; Baba Batra 109b, 123a; Sanhedrin 6b, 19b, 52b, 102a, 106a; Shevuot 16b; Makkot 9a, 10a, 23b; Avodah Zarah 5a, 36b; Horayot 10b; Zevachim 88b; Chullin 92a, 113a; Arachin 15b, 16a; Niddah 8b, 13a–b, 28a. Sasanian Empire, 6th century. In, e.g., Talmud Bavli. Edited by Yisroel Simcha Schorr, Chaim Malinowitz, and Mordechai Marcus, 72 volumes. Brooklyn: Mesorah Publications, 2006.

Medieval
Rashi. Commentary. Genesis 37–40. Troyes, France, late 11th century. In, e.g., Rashi. The Torah: With Rashi's Commentary Translated, Annotated, and Elucidated. Translated and annotated by Yisrael Isser Zvi Herczeg, volume 1, pages 409–46. Brooklyn: Mesorah Publications, 1995.
Rashbam. Commentary on the Torah. Troyes, early 12th century. In, e.g., Rabbi Samuel Ben Meir's Commentary on Genesis: An Annotated Translation. Translated by Martin I. Lockshin, pages 239–77. Lewiston, New York: The Edwin Mellen Press, 1989.
Abraham ibn Ezra. Commentary on the Torah. Mid-12th century. In, e.g., Ibn Ezra's Commentary on the Pentateuch: Genesis (Bereshit). Translated and annotated by H. Norman Strickman and Arthur M. Silver, pages 345–71. New York: Menorah Publishing Company, 1988.
Hezekiah ben Manoah. Hizkuni. France, circa 1240. In, e.g., Chizkiyahu ben Manoach. Chizkuni: Torah Commentary. Translated and annotated by Eliyahu Munk, volume 1, pages 269–92. Jerusalem: Ktav Publishers, 2013.
"Sermon on Wa-Yesheb." Second half of the 13th century. In Marc Saperstein. Jewish Preaching, 1200–1800: An Anthology, pages 124–36. New Haven: Yale University Press, 1989.

Nachmanides. Commentary on the Torah. Jerusalem, circa 1270. In, e.g., Ramban (Nachmanides): Commentary on the Torah: Genesis. Translated by Charles B. Chavel, volume 1, pages 446–92. New York: Shilo Publishing House, 1971.
Zohar, part 1, pages 179a–93a. Spain, late 13th century. In, e.g., The Zohar. Translated by Harry Sperling and Maurice Simon. 5 volumes. London: Soncino Press, 1934. And in, e.g., The Zohar: Pritzker Edition. Translation and commentary by Daniel C. Matt, volume 3, pages 85–179. Stanford, California: Stanford University Press, 2006.
Jami. Joseph and Zuleika. Persia, 15th century. In, e.g., Joseph and Zuleika. Translated by Charles F. Horne. Kessinger Publishers, 2005.
Isaac ben Moses Arama. Akedat Yizhak (The Binding of Isaac). Late 15th century. In, e.g., Yitzchak Arama. Akeydat Yitzchak: Commentary of Rabbi Yitzchak Arama on the Torah. Translated and condensed by Eliyahu Munk, volume 1, pages 229–52. New York, Lambda Publishers, 2001.

Modern
Isaac Abravanel. Commentary on the Torah. Italy, between 1492–1509. In, e.g., Abarbanel: Selected Commentaries on the Torah: Volume 1: Bereishis/Genesis. Translated and annotated by Israel Lazar, pages 233–77. Brooklyn: CreateSpace, 2015.
Obadiah ben Jacob Sforno. Commentary on the Torah. Venice, 1567. In, e.g., Sforno: Commentary on the Torah. Translation and explanatory notes by Raphael Pelcovitz, pages 198–217. Brooklyn: Mesorah Publications, 1997.
Moshe Alshich. Commentary on the Torah. Safed, circa 1593. In, e.g., Moshe Alshich. Midrash of Rabbi Moshe Alshich on the Torah. Translated and annotated by Eliyahu Munk, volume 1, pages 232–64. New York, Lambda Publishers, 2000.
Avraham Yehoshua Heschel. Commentaries on the Torah. Cracow, Poland, mid 17th century. Compiled as Chanukat HaTorah. Edited by Chanoch Henoch Erzohn. Piotrkow, Poland, 1900. In Avraham Yehoshua Heschel. Chanukas HaTorah: Mystical Insights of Rav Avraham Yehoshua Heschel on Chumash. Translated by Avraham Peretz Friedman, pages 89–95. Southfield, Michigan: Targum Press/Feldheim Publishers, 2004.

Thomas Hobbes. Leviathan, 3:36. England, 1651. Reprint edited by C. B. Macpherson, page 454. Harmondsworth, England: Penguin Classics, 1982.
Moshe Chaim Luzzatto. Mesillat Yesharim, ch. 4. Amsterdam, 1740. In Mesillat Yesharim: The Path of the Just, page 55. Jerusalem: Feldheim, 1966.
Chaim ibn Attar. Ohr ha-Chaim. Venice, 1742. In Chayim ben Attar. Or Hachayim: Commentary on the Torah. Translated by Eliyahu Munk, volume 1, pages 296–323. Brooklyn: Lambda Publishers, 1999.

Samuel David Luzzatto (Shadal). Commentary on the Torah. Padua, 1871. In, e.g., Samuel David Luzzatto. Torah Commentary. Translated and annotated by Eliyahu Munk, volume 2, pages 355–92. New York: Lambda Publishers, 2012.
Yehudah Aryeh Leib Alter. Sefat Emet. Góra Kalwaria (Ger), Poland, before 1906. Excerpted in The Language of Truth: The Torah Commentary of Sefat Emet. Translated and interpreted by Arthur Green, pages 55–59. Philadelphia: Jewish Publication Society, 1998. Reprinted 2012.
Maurice Elvey. Potiphar's Wife. Britain: British International Pictures (BIP), 1931.

Alexander Alan Steinbach. Sabbath Queen: Fifty-four Bible Talks to the Young Based on Each Portion of the Pentateuch, pages 25–29. New York: Behrman's Jewish Book House, 1936.
Irving Fineman. Jacob, An Autobiographical Novel. New York: Random House, 1941.
Thomas Mann. Joseph and His Brothers. Translated by John E. Woods, pages 14–15, 17–18, 36–37, 43–92, 130, 257, 269–71, 274–75, 303–04, 309, 315–1107, 1254–86. New York: Alfred A. Knopf, 2005. Originally published as Joseph und seine Brüder. Stockholm: Bermann-Fischer Verlag, 1943.
A. M. Klein. "Joseph." Canada, 1944. In The Collected Poems of A.M. Klein, page 11. Toronto: McGraw-Hill Ryerson, 1974.
Walter Orenstein and Hertz Frankel. Torah and Tradition: A Bible Textbook for Jewish Youth: Volume I: Bereishis, pages 94–106. New York: Hebrew Publishing Company, 1964.
Gerhard von Rad. “The Joseph Narrative and Ancient Wisdom.” In The Problem of the Hexateuch and Other Essays, pages 292–300. New York: McGraw-Hill Book Company, 1966. LCCN 66-11432.
Delmore Schwartz. "Jacob." In Selected Poems: Summer Knowledge, pages 233–35. New York: New Directions, 1967.
Thomas Thompson and Dorothy Thompson. “Some Legal Problems in the Book of Ruth.” Vetus Testamentum, volume 18, number 1 (January 1968): pages 79–99.
Donald B. Redford. A Study of the Biblical Story of Joseph (Genesis 37–50). Boston: Brill Publishers, 1970.
George W. Coats. "Widow's Rights: A Crux in the Structure of Genesis 38." Catholic Biblical Quarterly, volume 34 (1972): pages 461–66.
Umberto Cassuto. "The Story of Tamar and Judah." In Biblical and Oriental Studies. Translated by Israel Abrahams, volume 1, pages 29–40. Jerusalem: Magnes Press, 1973.
George W. Coats. "The Joseph Story and Wisdom: a Reappraisal." Catholic Biblical Quarterly, volume 35 (1973): pages 285–97.
Eric I. Lowenthal. The Joseph Narrative in Genesis, pages 14–46. Ktav, 1973.
George W. Coats. "Redactional Unity in Genesis 37–50." Journal of Biblical Literature, volume 93 (1974): pages 15–21.
Donald A. Seybold. "Paradox and Symmetry in the Joseph Narrative." In Literary Interpretations of Biblical Narratives. Edited by Kenneth R.R. Gros Louis, with James S. Ackerman & Thayer S. Warshaw, pages 59–73. Nashville: Abingdon Press, 1974.
John A. Emerton. "Some Problems in Genesis XXXVIII." Vetus Testamentum, volume 25 (1975): pages 338–61.
George W. Coats. From Canaan to Egypt: Structural and Theological Context for the Joseph Story. Washington, D.C.: Catholic Biblical Association, 1976.
John A. Emerton. "An Examination of a Recent Structuralist Interpretation of Genesis Xxxviii." Vetus Testamentum, volume 26 (1976): pages 79–98.
Seän M. Warner. “The Patriarchs and Extra-Biblical Sources.” Journal for the Study of the Old Testament, volume 1, number 2 (June 1976): pages 50–61.
J. Maxwell Miller. “The Patriarchs and Extra-Biblical Sources: a Response.” Journal for the Study of the Old Testament, volume 1, number 2 (June 1976): pages 62–66.
Elie Wiesel. "Joseph, or the Education of a Tzaddik." In Messengers of God: Biblical Portraits & Legends, pages 139–73. New York: Random House, 1976.
Judah Goldin. "The Youngest Son, or Where Does Genesis 38 Belong." Journal of Biblical Literature, volume 96 (1977): pages 27–44.
Peter D. Miscall. “The Jacob and Joseph Stories as Analogies.” Journal for the Study of the Old Testament, volume 3, number 6 (April 1978): pages 28–40.
Ivan Caine. “Numbers in the Joseph Narrative.” In Jewish Civilization: Essays and Studies: Volume 1. Edited by Ronald A. Brauner, pages 3–17. Philadelphia: Reconstructionist Rabbinical College, 1979. ISSN 0191-3034.
Robert Alter. “Joseph and his Brothers.” Commentary, volume 70 (number 5) (November 1980): pages 59–69.
Robert Alter. The Art of Biblical Narrative, pages 3–12. New York: Basic Books, 1981.
Nehama Leibowitz. Studies in Bereshit (Genesis), pages 394–438. Jerusalem: The World Zionist Organization, 1981. Reprinted as New Studies in the Weekly Parasha. Lambda Publishers, 2010.
Walter Brueggemann. Genesis: Interpretation: A Bible Commentary for Teaching and Preaching, pages 288–325. Atlanta: John Knox Press, 1982.
Harold Fisch. “Ruth and the Structure of Covenant History.” Vetus Testamentum, volume 32, number 4 (October 1982): pages 425–37.
Edward L. Greenstein. "An Equivocal Reading of the Sale of Joseph." In Literary Interpretations of Biblical Narratives: Volume II. Edited by Kenneth R.R. Gros Louis, with James S. Ackerman, pages 114–25. Nashville: Abingdon Press, 1982.
Adele Berlin. Poetics and Interpretation of Biblical Narrative, pages 60–61. Sheffield: The Almond Press, 1984.
Pinchas H. Peli. Torah Today: A Renewed Encounter with Scripture, pages 37–40. Washington, D.C.: B'nai B'rith Books, 1987.
Phyllis Bird. “Harlot as Heroine: Narrative Art and Social Presupposition in Three Old Testament Texts,” Semeia, volume 46 (1989): pages 119–39. (Tamar).
Marc Gellman. "The Coat of Many Colors." In Does God Have a Big Toe? Stories About Stories in the Bible, pages 61–64. New York: HarperCollins, 1989.
Nahum M. Sarna. The JPS Torah Commentary: Genesis: The Traditional Hebrew Text with the New JPS Translation, pages 254–80, 410. Philadelphia: Jewish Publication Society, 1989.
Sharon Pace Jeansonne. "Tamar: The Woman Who Demanded Justice" and "Potiphar's Wife: The Stereotyped Temptress." In The Women of Genesis: From Sarah to Potiphar's Wife, pages 98–113. Minneapolis: Fortress Press, 1990.
Frederick Buechner. The Son of Laughter, pages 205–40. New York: HarperSanFrancisco, 1993.

Leon R. Kass. “Assimilation versus Separation, by Aaron Wildavsky: To assimilate or to stay apart?” Commentary. (September 1, 1993).
Aaron Wildavsky. Assimilation versus Separation: Joseph the Administrator and the Politics of Religion in Biblical Israel. New Brunswick, New Jersey: Transaction Publishers, 1993.
Judith S. Antonelli. "Tamar: Widow-Prostitute." In In the Image of God: A Feminist Commentary on the Torah, pages 103–13. Northvale, New Jersey: Jason Aronson, 1995.
Shalom Goldman. The Wiles of Women/the Wiles of Men: Joseph and Potiphar's Wife in Ancient Near Eastern, Jewish, and Islamic Folklore. Albany, New York: State University of New York Press, 1995.
Naomi H. Rosenblatt and Joshua Horwitz. Wrestling With Angels: What Genesis Teaches Us About Our Spiritual Identity, Sexuality, and Personal Relationships, pages 313–40. Delacorte Press, 1995.
Avivah Gottlieb Zornberg. The Beginning of Desire: Reflections on Genesis, pages 243–83. New York: Image Books/Doubleday, 1995.

Ellen Frankel. The Five Books of Miriam: A Woman’s Commentary on the Torah, pages 72–80. New York: G. P. Putnam's Sons, 1996.
W. Gunther Plaut. The Haftarah Commentary, pages 92–100. New York: UAHC Press, 1996.
Sorel Goldberg Loeb and Barbara Binder Kadden. Teaching Torah: A Treasury of Insights and Activities, pages 58–64. Denver: A.R.E. Publishing, 1997.
Susan Freeman. Teaching Jewish Virtues: Sacred Sources and Arts Activities, pages 69–84, 241–54. Springfield, New Jersey: A.R.E. Publishing, 1999..
Francine Rivers. Unveiled: Tamar. Wheaton, Illinois: Tyndale House Publishers, 2000.

Israel Finkelstein and Neil Asher Silberman. “Searching for the Patriarchs.” In The Bible Unearthed: Archaeology's New Vision of Ancient Israel and the Origin of Its Sacred Texts, pages 27–47. New York: The Free Press, 2001.
Shlomith Yaron. “Sperm Stealing: A moral crime by three of David’s ancestresses.” Bible Review, volume 17 (number 1) (February 2001): pages 34–38, 44. (Tamar)
Lainie Blum Cogan and Judy Weiss. Teaching Haftarah: Background, Insights, and Strategies, pages 545–52. Denver: A.R.E. Publishing, 2002.
Michael Fishbane. The JPS Bible Commentary: Haftarot, pages 61–67. Philadelphia: Jewish Publication Society, 2002.
Tikva Frymer-Kensky. “Villains: Potiphar’s Wife, Delilah, and Athaliah.” In Reading the Women of the Bible, pages 74–77, 88. New York: Schocken Books, 2002.
Joseph Telushkin. The Ten Commandments of Character: Essential Advice for Living an Honorable, Ethical, Honest Life, pages 91–94, 129–32. New York: Bell Tower, 2003.
Robert Alter. The Five Books of Moses: A Translation with Commentary, pages xx, xxii–xxiii, xl, 206–29. New York: W.W. Norton & Co., 2004.
Jon D. Levenson. "Genesis." In The Jewish Study Bible. Edited by Adele Berlin and Marc Zvi Brettler, pages 74–81. New York: Oxford University Press, 2004.
John Van Seters. “The Joseph Story: Some Basic Observations.” In Egypt, Israel, and the Ancient Mediterranean World: Studies in Honor of Donald B. Redford. Edited by Gary N. Knoppers and Antoine Hirsch. Boston: Brill Publishers, 2004.
Professors on the Parashah: Studies on the Weekly Torah Reading Edited by Leib Moscovitz, pages 63–70. Jerusalem: Urim Publications, 2005.
Frank Anthony Spina. "Tamar's Resolve, Judah's Family, Israel's Future." In The Faith of the Outsider: Exclusion and Inclusion in the Biblical Story, pages 25–51. William B. Eerdmans Publishing Company, 2005.
W. Gunther Plaut. The Torah: A Modern Commentary: Revised Edition. Revised edition edited by David E.S. Stern, pages 244–65. New York: Union for Reform Judaism, 2006.
Nili Shupak. "A Fresh Look at the Dreams of the Officials and of Pharaoh in the Story of Joseph (Genesis 40–41) in the Light of Egyptian Dreams." Journal of the Ancient Near Eastern Society, volume 30 (2006): pages 103–138.
Suzanne A. Brody. "Brothers-in-arms." In Dancing in the White Spaces: The Yearly Torah Cycle and More Poems, page 71. Shelbyville, Kentucky: Wasteland Press, 2007.
Shmuel Goldin. Unlocking the Torah Text, pages 201–23. Jerusalem: Gefen Publishing House, 2007.
James L. Kugel. How To Read the Bible: A Guide to Scripture, Then and Now, pages 176–97, 495, 639. New York: Free Press, 2007.
Hillel I. Millgram. Four Biblical Heroines and the Case for Female Authorship: An Analysis of the Women of Ruth, Esther and Genesis 38. McFarland, 2007.
The Torah: A Women's Commentary. Edited by Tamara Cohn Eskenazi and Andrea L. Weiss, pages 209–32. New York: URJ Press, 2008.
Gregg Drinkwater. “Joseph’s Fabulous Technicolor Dreamcoat: Parashat Vayeshev (Genesis 37:1–40:23).” In Torah Queeries: Weekly Commentaries on the Hebrew Bible. Edited by Gregg Drinkwater, Joshua Lesser, and David Shneer; foreword by Judith Plaskow, pages 53–59. New York: New York University Press, 2009.
Reuven Hammer. Entering Torah: Prefaces to the Weekly Torah Portion, pages 53–56. New York: Gefen Publishing House, 2009.

Jonathan Sacks. Covenant & Conversation: A Weekly Reading of the Jewish Bible: Genesis: The Book of Beginnings, pages 243–69. New Milford, Connecticut: Maggid Books, 2009.
Carolyn J. Sharp. "'Am I in the Place of God?’: Joseph the Pretender" and "Tamar the Righteous." In Irony and Meaning in the Hebrew Bible, pages 54–61, 90–97. Bloomington, Indiana: Indiana University Press, 2009.
John H. Walton. "Genesis." In Zondervan Illustrated Bible Backgrounds Commentary. Edited by John H. Walton, volume 1, pages 120–29. Grand Rapids, Michigan: Zondervan, 2009.
Benjamin D.H. Hilbert. “Joseph’s Dreams, Part One: From Abimelech to Saul.” Journal for the Study of the Old Testament, volume 35 (number 3) (March 2011): pages 259–83.
Benjamin D.H. Hilbert. “Joseph’s Dreams, Part Two: From Saul to Solomon.” Journal for the Study of the Old Testament, volume 35 (number 4) (June 2011): pages 435–61.
Rachel Adelman. “Seduction and Recognition in the Story of Judah and Tamar and the Book of Ruth.” Nashim: A Journal of Jewish Women's Studies & Gender Issues, number 23 (Spring–Fall 2012): pages 87–109.
Calum Carmichael. The Book of Numbers: A Critique of Genesis, pages 10–11, 18–19, 24–25, 27–28, 30, 32, 35–37, 40, 42, 45, 50–52, 54–55, 57–65, 69–74, 77–78, 80–81, 83–87, 91–92, 94–95, 97, 100, 120, 126, 141, 159–60, 164–65, 167–72, 174, 176, 185. New Haven: Yale University Press, 2012.

William G. Dever. The Lives of Ordinary People in Ancient Israel: When Archaeology and the Bible Intersect, page 245. Grand Rapids, Michigan: William B. Eerdmans Publishing Company, 2012.
Shmuel Herzfeld. "One Shul: What It Really Means." In Fifty-Four Pick Up: Fifteen-Minute Inspirational Torah Lessons, pages 46–51. Jerusalem: Gefen Publishing House, 2012.
Jonathan Kruschwitz. “The Type-Scene Connection between Genesis 38 and the Joseph Story.” Journal for the Study of the Old Testament, volume 36 (number 4) (June 2012): pages 383–410.

Hillel I. Millgram. The Joseph Paradox: A Radical Reading of Genesis 37–50. Jefferson, North Carolina: McFarland and Company, 2012.
Eve Woogen. “The Best of Stories: Yusuf as Joseph in Hebrew Translations of the Qur'an.” Classics Honors Projects. (2012).
Dara Horn. A Guide for the Perplexed. New York: W.W. Norton & Company, 2013. (novel retelling the Joseph story).
Judith Corey. “Dreaming of Droughts: Genesis 37.1–11 in Dialogue with Contemporary Science.” Journal for the Study of the Old Testament, volume 38 (number 4) (June 2014): pages 425–38.
Edward Lipinski. "Cult Prostitution in Ancient Israel?" Biblical Archaeology Review, volume 40 (number 1) (January/February 2014): pages 48–56, 70.
Jonathan Sacks. Lessons in Leadership: A Weekly Reading of the Jewish Bible, pages 41–45. New Milford, Connecticut: Maggid Books, 2015.
Katie M. Heffelfinger. “From Bane to Blessing: The Food Leitmotif in Genesis 37–50.” Journal for the Study of the Old Testament, volume 40 (number 3) (March 2016): pages 297–320.
Peter Bekins. “Tamar and Joseph in Genesis 38 and 39.” Journal for the Study of the Old Testament, volume 40 (number 4) (June 2016): pages 375–97.
Jean-Pierre Isbouts. Archaeology of the Bible: The Greatest Discoveries From Genesis to the Roman Era, pages 67–79. Washington, D.C.: National Geographic, 2016.
Jonathan Sacks. Essays on Ethics: A Weekly Reading of the Jewish Bible, pages 53–58. New Milford, Connecticut: Maggid Books, 2016.
Shai Held. The Heart of Torah, Volume 1: Essays on the Weekly Torah Portion: Genesis and Exodus, pages 79–87. Philadelphia: Jewish Publication Society, 2017.
James L. Kugel. The Great Shift: Encountering God in Biblical Times, pages 20–22, 33, 182, 270–71, 281–82, 348. Boston: Houghton Mifflin Harcourt, 2017.
Steven Levy and Sarah Levy. The JPS Rashi Discussion Torah Commentary, pages 27–29. Philadelphia: Jewish Publication Society, 2017.
Jeffrey K. Salkin. The JPS B'nai Mitzvah Torah Commentary, pages 38–43. Philadelphia: Jewish Publication Society, 2017.
Bill Dauster. “Breaking News: He Admitted He Was Wrong.” Washington Jewish Week, November 29, 2018, page 24.

Andrew Tobolowsky. "The Problem of Reubenite Primacy: New Paradigms, New Answers." Journal of Biblical Literature, volume 139, number 1 (2020): pages 27–45.
Jacqueline Vayntrub. "Tamar and Her Botanical Image," Journal of Biblical Literature, volume 139, number 2 (2020): pages 301–18.
Liana Finck. Let There Be Light: The Real Story of Her Creation, pages 282–95. New York: Random House, 2022.

External links

Texts
Masoretic text and 1917 JPS translation
Hear the parashah chanted 
Hear the parashah read in Hebrew

Commentaries

Academy for Jewish Religion, California
Academy for Jewish Religion, New York
Aish.com 
Akhlah: The Jewish Children's Learning Network 
Aleph Beta Academy
Alicia Jo Rabins
American Jewish University—Ziegler School of Rabbinic Studies 
Ari Goldwag
Ascent of Safed
Chabad.org
eparsha.com
G-dcast 
The Israel Koschitzky Virtual Beit Midrash
Jewish Agency for Israel
Jewish Theological Seminary
Kabbala Online 
Mechon Hadar
Miriam Aflalo 
MyJewishLearning.com
Ohr Sameach
Orthodox Union
OzTorah, Torah from Australia
Oz Ve Shalom—Netivot Shalom
Pardes from Jerusalem
Professor James L. Kugel
Rabbi Dov Linzer
Rabbi Fabian Werbin
Rabbi Jonathan Sacks
Rabbi Shlomo Riskin
Rabbi Shmuel Herzfeld
Rabbi Stan Levin 
Reconstructionist Judaism 
Sephardic Institute
Shiur.com
613.org Jewish Torah Audio
Tanach Study Center
TheTorah.com
Torah from Dixie 
Torah.org
TorahVort.com
Union for Reform Judaism
United Synagogue of Conservative Judaism 
What's Bothering Rashi?
Yeshivat Chovevei Torah
Yeshiva University

Weekly Torah readings in Kislev
Weekly Torah readings from Genesis